The Sony Ericsson T650i is a mobile phone that was announced in May 2007. The T650i, along with the T250i, were a revival of the T series Sony Ericsson phones. The T series marked the debut of Sony and Ericsson's partnership with the Sony Ericsson T68i.

The T650i was available in four different colour schemes; "Growing Green", "Midnight Blue", "Eclipse Black" and "Precious Gold".  There was also a version of the phone for China Mainland; the Sony Ericsson T650c.

Features 
The T650 features a 3.2 megapixel camera (with autofocus & flash) and a secondary VGA camera located on the front which can be used for 3G video conferencing.   The phone also features a MP3/AAC music player, a MP4/3GP/3GPP video player, and an FM radio.  The phone comes with 16 MB of internal memory and a 256 MB Memory Stick Micro, but can be expanded to 2 GB via the Memory Stick Micro slot. The phone features flash themes which change depending on the time of day. Other features include multitasking, photo/video editing, picture blogging and web gallery uploading, QCIF video recording, stereo Bluetooth, and 3G data transferring capabilities of up to 384 kbit/s.

Included in Box 
The retail box of the T650i includes various accessories: a desk stand, a stereo headset, a pouch, a USB cable, a 256MB Memory Stick Micro, and PC software, along with a charge cable and the battery.

External links
 Official Sony Ericsson T650i Page
 GSMArena - Sony Ericsson T650i Review
 GSMArena - Sony Ericsson T650i Specs

T650i
Mobile phones introduced in 2007